Staubø is a village in Arendal municipality in Agder county, Norway. The village is located on the western shore of the island of Tverrdalsøya. Staubø is considered part of the urban area of Kilsund by Statistics Norway. Historically, the area surrounding Staubø was part of the municipality of Flosta (from 1902 to 1962) and the municipal seat of government was located in Staubø.

References

Villages in Agder
Arendal